Dow Jones is mainly a publishing company.

Dow Jones Consumer Media Group:
 The Wall Street Journal
 WSJ.
Barron's Media Group:
 Barron's
 MarketWatch
 Mansion Global
 Private Equity News
 Financial News
Dow Jones Enterprise Media Group:
 Dow Jones Newswires
 Dow Jones Factiva 
 Dow Jones Insight
 Dow Jones Companies & Executives
 Dow Jones Anti-Corruption
 Dow Jones Watchlist
 Dow Jones Private Equity Analyst
 Dow Jones VentureSource
Defunct:
Wall Street Journal Radio Network
 Far Eastern Economic Review
 SmartMoney
 Heat Street

For more lists of assets pages, see Lists of corporate assets

Dow Jones